Atunaisa Kaloumairai is a former Fijian politician. He was a member of the Senate of Fiji and represented Lomaiviti Province.

References

I-Taukei Fijian members of the Senate (Fiji)
Living people
Year of birth missing (living people)
Place of birth missing (living people)
Politicians from Lomaiviti Province